Mercy Ntia-Obong (born 4 October 1997) is a Nigerian athlete. She competed in the women's 4 × 100 metres relay event at the 2019 World Athletics Championships.

In 2019, she won the gold medal in the women's 4 × 100 metres relay at the 2019 African Games held in Rabat, Morocco. She also competed in the women's 200 metres.

References

External links

1997 births
Living people
Nigerian female sprinters
Place of birth missing (living people)
World Athletics Championships athletes for Nigeria
Athletes (track and field) at the 2019 African Games
African Games gold medalists for Nigeria
African Games medalists in athletics (track and field)
21st-century Nigerian women